The 1991–92 season was the 93rd completed season of The Football League.

Final league tables and results
The tables and results below are reproduced here in the exact form that they can be found at The Rec.Sport.Soccer Statistics Foundation website, with home and away statistics separated.

First Division

Overview
With the announcement halfway through the season that the Football Association would be creating a new Premier League of 22 clubs for the 1992–93 season, this was the final season of the old Football League First Division as the top flight of English football. The race for the title was mostly a two-horse race between Leeds United (promoted just two years earlier and previously league champions in 1969 and 1974) and a Manchester United who were fresh from back-to-back successes in cup competitions, but who had not won the First Division title since 1967. Alex Ferguson's side had a strong first half of the season, losing just once before the end of 1991, but then lost 4–1 at home to QPR on New Year's Day 1992, and a shortage of goals and wins during the second half of the season cost them the title, with Leeds clinching it on the penultimate weekend of the season when they won 3–2 at Sheffield United and Alex Ferguson's side lost 2–0 to Liverpool at Anfield, although they did manage to win the Football League Cup final two weeks earlier. The catalyst in the West Yorkshire side's title triumph had been a mid-season signing from France, 25-year-old striker Eric Cantona, who joined pre-season signing Rod Wallace and established stars including Gary McAllister, Lee Chapman and Gordon Strachan as well as promising midfielders Gary Speed and David Batty as part of the team which clinched the title. The latest additions to Manchester United's ever-changing squad were goalkeeper Peter Schmeichel, defender Paul Parker and winger Andrei Kanchelskis, while teenage winger Ryan Giggs established himself as a regular and crucial member of the first team squad before his 18th birthday, having made his debut the previous season.

Newly promoted Sheffield Wednesday had won the Football League Cup to end their 56-year wait for a major trophy, but were then left without a manager when Ron Atkinson accepted the offer to take over at Aston Villa. The Hillsborough club then turned to veteran striker Trevor Francis, who was appointed player-manager and took them to third place in the final table and into the UEFA Cup, delivering European qualification to the club for the first time since the 1960s. Defending champions Arsenal had a disappointing start to the season, but the £2.5million signing of striker Ian Wright from Crystal Palace in late September helped the Gunners recover their form, and they finished fourth in the final table, although their first venture into the European Cup for 20 years ended in the second round, and they then suffered a shock first-hurdle exit from the FA Cup at the hands of Fourth Division side Wrexham. Manchester City finished fifth for the second season running, while a Liverpool side in transition in their first full season under the management of Graeme Souness finished a disappointing sixth in the league but still managed to win the FA Cup. 

West Ham United and Notts County went straight back down to the First Division after just one season, while Luton Town were relegated on the final day of the season after a decade in the First Division, with their defeat at the season's end ensuring that Coventry City secured a 26th successive season among the elite. Norwich City, who reached the semi-finals of the FA Cup for the second time in four seasons but finished 18th after a dismal end to the league season, saw their manager Dave Stringer resign after an eventful five seasons and hand over the reins to coach Mike Walker. Oldham Athletic's first top flight campaign since the 1920s saw them secure survival with a 17th-place finish and book a place in the new Premier League. Southampton spent much of the season battling against relegation before a seven-match winning run during the second half of the campaign helped lift them to safety, with all eyes at The Dell being on Southampton's top scorer, 21-year-old striker Alan Shearer, who scored on his England debut in February and was subject of interest from a string of bigger clubs throughout the campaign, although he decided to remain on the South Coast until the end of the season before manager Ian Branfoot invited offers with "cash plus unwanted players" in return to Shearer's services, with fees in the region of £3million being quotes and the likes of Manchester United and Liverpool being strongly linked with Shearer's signature.

As one highly promising English striker's career was taking off, a goal scoring legend was on his way out of the English league. In November 1991, Tottenham and England striker Gary Lineker accepted an offer to sign for Japanese side Grampus Eight at the end of the season. Lineker finished the season as PFA Player of the Year and was among the top scorers with 28 First Division goals, before bowing out of the international scene at the European Championships in Sweden, making the last of his 80 appearances for the national side in a 2–1 defeat to Sweden at the end of an international career where a total of 48 goals left him just one goal short of Bobby Charlton's (then) record of 49 England goals.

Table

Results

Map

Second Division

Overview
The Second Division title was won by Ipswich Town, with John Lyall taking the Suffolk club back to the top flight after a six-year absence. Middlesbrough were also automatically promoted as runners-up on the final day of the season, but it was play-off winners Blackburn Rovers whose promotion made the biggest headlines. Bankrolled by millionaire chairman Jack Walker and managed by former Liverpool boss Kenny Dalglish, Rovers spent several million pounds of building a promotion-winning squad, clinching their promotion with a 1–0 win over Leicester City in the play-off final, booking a place in the new Premier League after 26 years away from the elite of the English league. Blackburn had also overcome the Second Division's other heavy-spending side, Derby County in the semi-finals of the playoffs. Leicester had faced a different sort of challenge in their semi-final clash, travelling to East Anglia for the first leg, where they were paired with a Cambridge United managed by John Beck and the attack being led by Leicester-born forward Dion Dublin, in hunt of a unique third successive promotion. The first leg at the Abbey Stadium had ended in a 1–1 draw, before Leicester triumphed 5–0 in the return leg at Filbert Street. 

In manager Jim Smith's first full season as manager, Portsmouth just missed out on the Second Division playoffs but enjoyed a memorable run in the FA Cup, taking eventual winners Liverpool to a replay in the semi-finals before losing on penalties. 

By the turn of 1992, fallen giants Newcastle United were struggling at the foot of the Second Division, millions of pounds in debt and facing relegation to the third tier for the first time ever. However, the club's future was secured in a takeover deal by millionaire John Hall, who sacked Ossie Ardiles as manager in early February and appointed former England striker Kevin Keegan as manager of the club where he had ended his playing career eight years earlier. Keegan kept Newcastle up and the club's new owners made money available to build a team capable of winning promotion in the 1992–93 season.

Newcastle's local rivals Sunderland were disappointing in the league, failing to mount a promotion challenge in the Second Division following their relegation the previous campaign, but reached the FA Cup final – the first team from the Second Division to do so for more than a decade – where they lost 2–0 to Liverpool.

The relegation places were occupied by Port Vale, Plymouth Argyle and Brighton & Hove Albion. The Valiants had been in the Second Division for the previous three seasons and had spent most of that time in the bottom half of the table, while Plymouth (who replaced manager David Kemp with the former England goalkeeper Peter Shilton in February 1992) had enjoyed six seasons in the Second Division but had also struggled for much of that time apart from a seventh-place finish in 1987. Brighton, however, had been on the brink of First Division football 12 months before being relegated, being beaten finalists in the previous season's playoff final, but the sale of players including top scorer Mike Small and rising debt restricting their options on the transfer market ultimately sent them down to the third tier.

Table

Results

Play-offs

The semi-finals were decided over two legs, while the final consisted a single match.

Map

Third Division

Overview
In their first full season under the management of Phil Holder, Brentford clinched in the Third Division title and won promotion to the newly rebranded Division One for the 1992–93 season, ending their 14-year run in the league's third tier. Birmingham City, another team with a new manager in the shape of Terry Cooper, finished runners-up to claim their return to the league's second tier at the third time of asking. In the playoffs, two newly promoted teams battled it out for a second successive promotion. Peterborough United came out 2-1 winners against Stockport County to reach the league's second tier for the first time. 

Lou Macari's first season as manager of Stoke City ended in disappointment as they finished fourth in the league but saw their promotion hopes ended by a defeat to Stockport County in the playoffs. West Bromwich Albion, in the Third Division for the first time, failed to win promotion at the first time of asking, a win at doomed Shrewsbury Town on the final day of the season not being enough to secure a playoff place. This disappointment was swiftly followed by the end of Bobby Gould's unpopular 15-month reign as manager. Bolton Wanderers, who had narrowly missed out on promotion the previous season, finished a disappointing 13th in the league and sacked manager Phil Neal after nearly seven years in charge, turning to Bruce Rioch as the man to mastermind their Division Two promotion challenge for the 1992–93 season.

Darlington suffered an immediate relegation back to the Fourth Division following two successive promotions, with manager Frank Gray unable to adjust the County Durham side to the pace of a higher division following the departure of his predecessor Brian Little in the summer of 1991. Torquay United also went straight back down to the league's basement division, following a turbulent season which saw three different men occupy the manager's seat at Plainmoor, with not even the mid-season signing of striker Justin Fashanu and his 10 goals from 21 Third Division fixtures being enough to secure survival. Shrewsbury Town also went down, as did a Bury side who had almost won promotion the previous season.

Table

Results

Play-offs
The semi-finals were decided over two legs, while the final consisted of a single match.

Map

Fourth Division

Overview
Following a slow start to the season which saw manager Frank Casper replaced by Jimmy Mullen in October 1991, Burnley made huge progress in the league and won the Fourth Division title to join Wolverhampton Wanderers as champions of all four divisions of the Football League, also ending their seven-year stay in the Fourth Division.

Runners-up Rotherham United and third-placed Mansfield Town achieved immediate promotion from the Fourth Division, one season after relegation. They were joined by the previous season's beaten playoff finalists Blackpool, who found themselves level with their opponents at the end of extra time as had happened a year earlier, but this time emerged victorious after defeating Scunthorpe United in the shootout. Barnet, in the Football League for the first time, reached the playoff semi-finals but their hopes of a second successive promotion were ended when they were beaten by Blackpool. Crewe Alexandra's hopes of an instant return to the league's third tier were ended in a similar fashion by Scunthorpe United.

On 25 March 1992, Aldershot were declared bankrupt and obliged to resign from the Football League – their record was expunged. A new club to represent the Hampshire town was formed within weeks, but Aldershot Town had to start the 1992–93 season in the Third Division of Isthmian League – five divisions below the original club's final division. Carlisle United eventually finished bottom, but there was no relegation from the Football League in 1991–92 – although Conference champions Colchester United were still promoted, returning to the league after a two-year absence. 

Wrexham, the league's lowest placed club the previous season, made good progress in 1991–92 to finish 14th, but the big story of the season came in January 1992 when they defeated defending First Division champions Arsenal 2–1 at the Racecourse Ground in their FA Cup third round tie.

As the season drew to its close, speculation was mounting about the future of another club, Maidstone United, who had been without a home of their own since becoming tenants at Dartford in 1988 and were now hundreds of thousands of pounds in debt. 

Returning to the Football League for the 1992–93 season were the Conference champions Colchester United, who were promoted back to the league after a two-year absence following a two-horse promotion race with Wycombe Wanderers.

Table

Results

Play-offs

The semi-finals were decided over two legs, while the final consisted of a single match.

Map

See also
 1991–92 in English football

References

 
English Football League seasons